Wu Yuyin (Chinese: 吴禹寅; Pinyin: Wú Yǔyín; born 8 January 1990 in Liuzhou) is a Chinese football player who currently plays for Yinchuan Helanshan in the China League Two.

Club career
Wu joined Zhejiang Greentown youth team system in 2002. He started his professional football career in 2007 when he was sent to China League Two side Hangzhou Sanchao (Zhejiang Greentown Youth). Wu was promoted to Hangzhou Greentown's first team squad in 2011. On 20 October 2012, he made his Super League debut in a 1–1 home draw against Guizhou Renhe.

Wu transferred to Super League newcomer Shanghai Dongya in December 2012. On 7 April 2013, he made his debut for Shanghai Dongya in a 2–0 home victory against Changchun Yatai, coming on as a substitute for Luis Cabezas in the 78th minute. He was degraded to the reserve team squad in the 2015 season.

On 5 January 2016, he transferred to China League One club Dalian Yifang. He was named at Dalian's reserve squad in the 2017 season.

On 23 June 2017, Wu moved to China League Two side Yinchuan Helanshan on a half season loan deal.

Career statistics 
Statistics accurate as of match played 4 November 2017.

References

1990 births
Living people
Chinese footballers
Association football defenders
Footballers from Guangxi
Zhejiang Professional F.C. players

Shanghai Port F.C. players
Dalian Professional F.C. players
Chinese Super League players
China League One players
People from Liuzhou